The 2003–04 National Division One was the seventeenth full season of rugby union within the second tier of the English league system, currently known as the RFU Championship.  New teams to the division included Bristol Shoguns who had been relegated from the Zurich Premiership 2002-03 while Penzance & Newlyn and Henley Hawks were promoted from the 2002–03 National Division Two.  In terms of ground changes Plymouth Albion had a new home - moving from Beacon Park to newly built Brickfields which at 6,500 had twice the capacity of the original ground.

After three consecutive seasons finishing second, Worcester became champions and were promoted to the Zurich Premiership for season 2004–05.  Orrell were runners–up, and Wakefield and Manchester were relegated to the 2004–05 National Division Two.  Wakefield's final match was on 26 April 2004 against Coventry, who won the match 15–11 and with that defeat, consigned Wakefield, after fourteen consecutive seasons in National Division One, to relegation; while Coventry finished above Wakefield only on points difference. Wakefield folded during the summer for financial reasons.

Participating teams

Final table

Results

Round 1

Round 2

Round 3

Round 4

Round 5

Round 6

Round 7

Round 8 

Postponed.  Game rescheduled to 20 December 2003.

Postponed.  Game rescheduled to 21 February 2004.

Postponed.  Game rescheduled to 20 December 2003.

Postponed.  Game rescheduled to 20 December 2003.

Round 9

Round 10

Round 11

Round 12

Round 8 (Rescheduled games)

Round 13 

Postponed.  Game rescheduled to 3 January 2004.

Postponed.  Game rescheduled to 3 January 2004.

Round 13 (Rescheduled games)

Round 14

Round 15

Round 16

Round 17

Round 18

Round 19

Round 8 & 25 (Rescheduled games) 

Game brought forward from 17 April 2004.

Round 20 

Postponed.  Game rescheduled for 7 March 2004.

Round 20 & 25 (Rescheduled games) 

Game brought forward from 17 April 2004.

Round 21 

Postponed.  Game rescheduled for 27 March 2004.

Round 22

Round 21 (Rescheduled game)

Round 23

Round 24

Round 25 

Game brought forward to 6 March 2004.

Game brought forward to 21 February 2004.

Postponed.  Game rescheduled for 21 April 2004.

Round 25 (Rescheduled game)

Round 26

Total Season Attendances

Individual statistics 

 Note that points scorers include tries as well as conversions, penalties, and drop goals.

Top points scorers

Top try scorers

Season records

Team
Largest home win — 79 pts
85 - 6 Exeter Chiefs at home to Manchester on 28 February 2004
Largest away win — 54 pts
54 - 0 Exeter Chiefs away to Wakefield on 13 March 2004
Most points scored — 85 pts
85 - 6 Exeter Chiefs at home to Manchester on 28 February 2004
Most tries in a match — 13
Exeter Chiefs at home to Manchester on 28 February 2004
Most conversions in a match — 10 (x2)
Exeter Chiefs at home to Manchester on 28 February 2004
Orrell at home to Manchester on 10 April 2004
Most penalties in a match — 7
Exeter Chiefs away to Otley on 20 September 2003
Most drop goals in a match — 2
Coventry at home to Worcester on 10 April 2004

Player
Most points in a match — 31
 Leigh Hinton for Orrell at home to Bedford Blues on 6 December 2003
Most tries in a match — 4 (x3)
 Dan Ward-Smith for Plymouth Albion at home to Henley Hawks on 20 March 2004
 Richard Welding for Orrell at home to Manchester on 10 April 2004
 Lee Carruthers for Otley at home to Manchester 13 December 2003
Most conversions in a match — 10 (x2)
 Tony Yapp for Exeter Chiefs at home to Manchester on 28 February 2004
 Leigh Hinton for Orrell at home to Manchester on 10 April 2004
Most penalties in a match —  7
 Tony Yapp for Exeter Chiefs away to Otley on 20 September 2003
Most drop goals in a match —  1
N/A - multiple players

Attendances

Highest — 6,025 
Worcester at home to Pertemps Bees on 24 April 2004
Lowest — 187 
Manchester at home to Pertemps Bees on 3 April 2004
Highest Average Attendance — 2,460
Worcester
Lowest Average Attendance — 367 	
Wakefield

See also
 English rugby union system

References

2003–04 in English rugby union leagues
2003-04